The 1928 United States Senate election in Wyoming took place on November 6, 1928. Democratic Senator John B. Kendrick ran for re-election to a third term. He faced Republican Congressman Charles E. Winter in the general election, and a competitive general election ensued. Kendrick ended up winning re-election by a narrow margin, with Winters's campaign likely assisted by the strong performance of Herbert Hoover in that year's presidential election. Kendrick's third term would turn out to be his last; he died while in office on November 3, 1933, about a year until the seat would next be up. Joseph C. O'Mahoney was appointed to serve out the remainder of Kendrick's term and would end up winning the ensuing election in 1934.

Democratic primary

Candidates
 John B. Kendrick, incumbent U.S. Senator

Results

Republican Primary

Candidates
 Charles E. Winter, U.S. Congressman from Wyoming's at-large congressional district

Results

General election

Results

References

1928
Wyoming
United States Senate